Most Rev. Daniel C. Okoh is General Overseer of the Christ Holy Church International, a.k.a. Nation Builders, a former vice President of the Christian Association of Nigeria, and President of the Organisation of African Instituted Churches.
Daniel Okoh was elected President of the Christian Association of Nigeria(CAN) in July 2022. CAN is the apex body of all Christians in the country, comprising five blocs. He became the first from the OAIC bloc of Christian Association of Nigeria to hold the position.

References

Living people
Nigerian Christians
Year of birth missing (living people)
Place of birth missing (living people)